Giuseppe Leone (born 5 May 2001) is an Italian professional footballer who plays as a midfielder for  club Siena.

Career statistics

Club

References

2001 births
Living people
Italian footballers
Italy youth international footballers
Association football midfielders
Serie C players
Juventus F.C. players
Juventus Next Gen players
A.C.N. Siena 1904 players